Mark Schatz (born April 23, 1955) is an American bassist, banjoist, mandolinist, guitarist, clogger, and hambone performer who has recorded on albums for and toured with artists including Bela Fleck, Nickel Creek, Jerry Douglas, Maura O'Connell, Tony Rice, John Hartford, Emmylou Harris, Linda Ronstadt, and Tim O'Brien.

Background
Schatz was born into a musical family in Philadelphia, Pennsylvania and grew up in Lexington, Massachusetts, near Boston.

From 1973 to 1978 he studied music theory and composition at Haverford College, after which he studied for a year at the Berklee College of Music in Boston.  He relocated to Nashville, Tennessee in 1983.

Career
Mark Schatz is a two time International Bluegrass Music Association Bass Player of the Year award winner.  Schatz toured and recorded with progressive acoustic trio Nickel Creek from 2003 until the start of the band's indefinite hiatus in late 2007. Schatz is also a solo artist who has recorded two solo albums on Rounder Records, his debut produced by Bela Fleck. His band, "Mark Schatz & Friends," is composed of Schatz, Casey Driessen, Missy Raines, and Jim Hurst. Schatz has produced albums for various bluegrass artists including The Duhks, and has recorded with Nefesh Mountain.

Discography

Solo
1995: Brand New Old Tyme Way
2006: Steppin' in the Boilerhouse

With Nickel Creek
2005: Why Should the Fire Die?
2006: Reasons Why: The Very Best

References

External links
Official website

American record producers
1955 births
Living people
Bluegrass Album Band members
People from Lexington, Massachusetts
Musicians from Nashville, Tennessee
American double-bassists
American banjoists
American country banjoists
American country mandolinists
American bluegrass mandolinists
Haverford College alumni